I'm Your Man may refer to:

Books
 I'm Your Man: The Life of Leonard Cohen, a 2012 biography by Sylvie Simmons

Film
 I'm Your Man (1992 film), an American interactive short film
 I'm Your Man (2021 film), a German drama film
 Leonard Cohen: I'm Your Man, a 2005 American documentary

Music

Albums
 I'm Your Man (Jason Sellers album) or the title song (see below), 1997
 I'm Your Man (Leonard Cohen album) or the title song (see below), 1988

Songs
 "I'm Your Man" (2PM song), 2011
 "I'm Your Man" (Barry Manilow song), 1986
 "I'm Your Man", a song by Jason Sellers song from the 1997 eponymous album
 "I'm Your Man" (Leonard Cohen song), 1988
 "I'm Your Man" (Wham! song), 1985
 "Come See Me" (The Pretty Things song), 1966, aka "I'm Your Man"
 "I'm Your Man", by Enrique Iglesias from Enrique, 1999
 "I'm Your Man", by Guy Sebastian from T.R.U.T.H., 2020
 "I'm Your Man", by Richard Hell and the Voidoids from Blank Generation, 1990 reissue

See also 
 "I Am Your Man", a 1968 song by Bobby Taylor & the Vancouvers
 "I Am Your Man", a 2009 song by Seal